Events in the year 1979 in Cyprus.

Incumbents 

 President: Spyros Kyprianou
 President of the Parliament: Alekos Michaelides

Events 
Ongoing – Cyprus dispute

 15 June – U.N. Security Council Resolution 451 was adopted and noted that, due to the existing circumstances, the presence of the United Nations Peacekeeping Force in Cyprus (UNFICYP) would continue to be essential for a peaceful settlement.

Deaths

References 

 
1970s in Cyprus
Years of the 21st century in Cyprus
Cyprus
Cyprus
Cyprus